Bloem is a Dutch name, meaning "flower" as well as "flour". As a feminine given name, also rendered Bloeme, it signifies flower, youth, and beauty. The surname can have a variety of origins; besides a matronymic, the surname can have originated as descriptive (e.g. finest) or metonymic occupational (gardener, miller, baker). The variants Bloeme and Bloemen are thought to be primarily matronymic. People with the name include:


Given name
Bloeme Evers-Emden (1926–2016), Dutch Jewish teacher and child psychologist
Bloem de Ligny (born 1978), Dutch singer/songwriter and visual artist

Surname
Bloem
Adriaen Bloem or Adriaen van Bloemen (1639–c.1697), Flemish painter active in Austria
An Bloem, eponymous character from the 1983 Dutch movie
Arend Bloem (born 1947), Dutch sprint canoer
J. C. Bloem (1887–1966), Dutch poet and essayist, grandson of Jacobus Cornelis Bloem
Jacobus Cornelis Bloem (1825–1902), Dutch politician, Minister of Finances 1885–88
Jamie Bloem (born 1971), Australian rugby player and referee
Marion Bloem (born 1952), Dutch writer and film maker
Walter Bloem (1868–1951), German novelist and soldier
Walter Julius Bloem (1898–1945), German writer and soldier, son of the above
Willem Bloem (Willie) (1981-), Inventor and engineer, son of Willem Bloem Snr.
Bloemen
Adriaen van Bloemen or Adriaen Bloem (1639–c.1697), Flemish painter active in Austria
Johannes Bloemen (1864–1939), Dutch swimmer
Karin Bloemen (born 1960), Dutch actress and singer
Ted-Jan Bloemen (born 1986), Dutch-Canadian speed skater
Three brothers Van Bloemen:
Jan Frans van Bloemen (1662–1749), Flemish landscape painter active in Italy
Norbert van Bloemen (1670–1746), Flemish painter active in Holland
Pieter van Bloemen (1657–1720), Flemish landscape and animal painter

Places
The nickname and shortened form of Bloemfontein, a city in South Africa

See also
Blom (surname), Dutch surname of the same origin
Bloom (surname), English surname of the same origin
Blum (disambiguation), German surname of the same origin

References

Dutch-language surnames